The Panagyurishte Treasure is a Thracian treasure.

Description 

The treasure consists of a phiale, an amphora, three oinochoai and four rhytons  with total weight of 6.164 kg of 24-karat gold. All  nine vessels are richly and skilfully decorated. It is dated from the turn of the 4th-3rd centuries BC. It is thought to have been used as a royal ceremonial set by the Thracian king Seuthes III.

The items may have been buried to hide them during 4th century BC invasions of the area by the Celts or Macedonians. The phiale carries inscriptions giving its weight in Greek drachmae and Persian darics.

Discovery 

It was accidentally discovered on 8 December 1949 by three brothers, Pavel, Petko, and Michail Deikov, who worked together at the region of “Merul” tile factory near the railway station of the town of Panagyurishte, Bulgaria. At the time of its discovery it was considered "the richest treasure to have been unearthed in Europe since World War II.".

Exhibitions around the world and replicas 

As one of the best known surviving artefacts of Thracian culture, the treasure has been displayed at various museums around the world. The treasure is the centerpiece of the Thracian art collection of the Plovdiv Regional Historical Museum, the National Museum of History in Sofia, and the History Museum in Panagyurishte.  There are three replica sets, which are displayed in the museums in Panagyurishte, Sofia and Plovdiv, when the authentic treasure is lent for exhibitions abroad.

See also
Rogozen Treasure
Valchitran Treasure
Lukovit Treasure
Borovo Treasure

Notes

Selected bibliography

 
 
 
 

 

 via- Met Publications

Gallery

External links

Panagyurishte Treasure
The Panagyurishte Golden TreasureEnglish
The Panagyurishte Treasure at the Plovdiv Archaeological MuseumEnglish

1949 archaeological discoveries
Panagyurishte
Treasure troves in Bulgaria
History of Pazardzhik Province
Gold objects
Ancient Thrace
Ancient Greek metalwork
Individual vases